Palos Park is a station on Metra's SouthWest Service in Palos Park, Illinois. In Metra's zone-based fare system, Palos Park is in zone E. As of 2018, Palos Park is the 112th busiest of Metra's 236 non-downtown stations, with an average of 424 weekday boardings.

As of January 16, 2023, Palos Park is served by all 30 trains (15 in each direction) on weekdays. Saturday service is currently suspended.

References

External links 

Station from 123rd Street from Google Maps Street View

Metra stations in Illinois
Railway stations in Cook County, Illinois
Former Wabash Railroad stations